The Kansas City Committee of 101 was founded by Jack Wheeler. The name was chosen because the membership was limited to 101 Kansas City Chiefs fans and cost $1,000 annually (over $6,550 adjusted for inflation).  The group began presenting its annual NFL awards in 1969. They started as NFL and AFL Awards. After the 1970 AFL-NFL merger, however, they have been awarded to the top AFC and NFC players and coaches. The "Committee of 101" is a national media committee of 101 sportswriters and sportscasters, who cover the NFL, and are asked to vote on the top offensive player, defensive player, and coach on each of the National Football League conferences, rather than the NFL as a whole.

The annual NFL 101 Awards, is the nation's oldest awards event dedicated exclusively to professional football.

The awards are handed out at an annual event in Kansas City, Missouri, and all proceeds from the 101 Awards benefit the Kansas City Chiefs Charities.

Offensive Player of the Year awards

Defensive Player of the Year awards 

NFC Defensive Player of the Year
1969—  Carl Eller, Minnesota Vikings
1970—  Alan Page, Minnesota Vikings 
1971—  Alan Page, Minnesota Vikings
1972—  Chris Hanburger, Washington Redskins
1973—  Lee Roy Jordan, Dallas Cowboys
1974—  Alan Page, Minnesota Vikings
1975—  Jack Youngblood, Los Angeles Rams
1976—  Jack Youngblood, Los Angeles Rams
1977—  Harvey Martin, Dallas Cowboys
1978—  Randy White, Dallas Cowboys
1979— Lee Roy Selmon, Tampa Bay Buccaneers
1980—  Nolan Cromwell, Los Angeles Rams
1981— Fred Dean, San Francisco 49ers
1982— No award due to players strike
1983— Dave Butz, Washington Redskins
1984—  Lawrence Taylor, New York Giants
1985— Mike Singletary, Chicago Bears
1986 —Lawrence Taylor, New York Giants
1987— Reggie White, Philadelphia Eagles
1988— Mike Singletary, Chicago Bears
1989— Keith Millard, Minnesota Vikings
1990— Charles Haley, San Francisco 49ers
1991— Pat Swilling, New Orleans Saints
1992— Wilber Marshall, Washington Redskins
1993— Deion Sanders, Atlanta Falcons
1994— Deion Sanders, San Francisco 49ers
1995— Reggie White, Green Bay Packers
1996— Kevin Greene, Carolina Panthers
1997— Dana Stubblefield, San Francisco 49ers
1998— Reggie White, Green Bay Packers
1999— Warren Sapp, Tampa Bay Buccaneers
2000— La'Roi Glover, New Orleans Saints 
2001— Michael Strahan, New York Giants
2002— Derrick Brooks, Tampa Bay Buccaneers
2003— Michael Strahan, New York Giants
2004— Julius Peppers, Carolina Panthers
2005— Brian Urlacher, Chicago Bears
2006— Brian Urlacher, Chicago Bears
2007— Patrick Kerney, Seattle Seahawks
2008— DeMarcus Ware, Dallas Cowboys
2009— Charles Woodson, Green Bay Packers
2010— Clay Matthews, Green Bay Packers
2011— Jared Allen, Minnesota Vikings
2012— Aldon Smith, San Francisco 49ers
2013— Luke Kuechly, Carolina Panthers
2014— Richard Sherman, Seattle Seahawks
2015— Aaron Donald, St. Louis Rams
2016— Landon Collins, New York Giants 
2017— Aaron Donald, Los Angeles Rams
2018— Aaron Donald, Los Angeles Rams
2019— Chandler Jones, Arizona Cardinals
2020— Aaron Donald, Los Angeles Rams
2021— Micah Parsons, Dallas Cowboys

AFC Defensive Player of the Year
1969— Bobby Bell, Kansas City Chiefs
1970— Mike Curtis, Baltimore Colts 
1971— Willie Lanier, Kansas City Chiefs
1972— Joe Greene, Pittsburgh Steelers
1973— Dick Anderson, Miami Dolphins
1974— Joe Greene, Pittsburgh Steelers
1975— Mel Blount, Pittsburgh Steelers
1976— Jack Lambert, Pittsburgh Steelers
1977— Lyle Alzado, Denver Broncos
1978— Randy Gradishar, Denver Broncos
1979— Mike Reinfeldt, Houston Oilers
1980— Lester Hayes, Oakland Raiders
1981— Joe Klecko, New York Jets
1982— No award due to players strike
1983— Doug Betters, Miami Dolphins
1984— Kenny Easley, Seattle Seahawks
1985— Andre Tippett, New England Patriots
1986— Deron Cherry, Kansas City Chiefs
1987— Bruce Smith, Buffalo Bills
1988— Cornelius Bennett, Buffalo Bills
1989— Michael Dean Perry, Cleveland Browns
1990— Bruce Smith, Buffalo Bills
1991— Derrick Thomas, Kansas City Chiefs
1992— Cortez Kennedy, Seattle Seahawks
1993— Rod Woodson, Pittsburgh Steelers
1994— Greg Lloyd, Pittsburgh Steelers
1995— Bryce Paup, Buffalo Bills
1996— Bruce Smith, Buffalo Bills
1997— Carnell Lake, Pittsburgh Steelers
1998— Junior Seau, San Diego Chargers
1999— Jevon Kearse, Tennessee Titans
2000— Ray Lewis, Baltimore Ravens
2001— Ray Lewis, Baltimore Ravens
2002— Jason Taylor, Miami Dolphins
2003— Ray Lewis, Baltimore Ravens
2004— Ed Reed, Baltimore Ravens
2005— Dwight Freeney, Indianapolis Colts
2006— Jason Taylor, Miami Dolphins
2007— Bob Sanders, Indianapolis Colts
2008— James Harrison, Pittsburgh Steelers
2009— Darrelle Revis, New York Jets
2010— Troy Polamalu, Pittsburgh Steelers
2011— Terrell Suggs, Baltimore Ravens
2012— J. J. Watt, Houston Texans
2013— Robert Mathis, Indianapolis Colts
2014— J. J. Watt, Houston Texans
2015— J. J. Watt, Houston Texans
2016— Khalil Mack, Oakland Raiders
2017— Calais Campbell, Jacksonville Jaguars
2018— J. J. Watt, Houston Texans
2019— Stephon Gilmore, New England Patriots
2020— T. J. Watt, Pittsburgh Steelers
2021— T. J. Watt, Pittsburgh Steelers

Coach of the Year awards
See: National Football League Coach of the Year Award#Kansas City Committee of 101 AFC/NFC Coach of the Year Awards

NFC Coach of the Year
1969—  Bud Grant, Minnesota Vikings
1970—  Dick Nolan, San Francisco 49ers
1971—  George Allen, Washington Redskins
1972—  Dan Devine, Green Bay Packers
1973—  Chuck Knox, Los Angeles Rams
1974—  Don Coryell, St. Louis Cardinals
1975—  Tom Landry, Dallas Cowboys
1976—  George Allen, Washington Redskins
1977—  Leeman Bennett, Atlanta Falcons
1978—  Dick Vermeil, Philadelphia Eagles
1979—  Dick Vermeil, Philadelphia Eagles
1980—  Leeman Bennett, Atlanta Falcons
1981—  Bill Walsh, San Francisco 49ers
1982—  No award due to players strike
1983—  Joe Gibbs, Washington Redskins
1984—  Bill Walsh, San Francisco 49ers
1985—  Mike Ditka, Chicago Bears
1986—  Bill Parcells, New York Giants
1987—  Jim Mora, New Orleans Saints
1988—  Mike Ditka, Chicago Bears
1989—  Lindy Infante, Green Bay Packers
1990—  George Seifert, San Francisco 49ers
1991—  Wayne Fontes, Detroit Lions
1992—  Mike Holmgren, Green Bay Packers
1993—  Dan Reeves, New York Giants
1994—  Dave Wannstedt, Chicago Bears
1995—  Ray Rhodes, Philadelphia Eagles
1996—  Dom Capers, Carolina Panthers
1997—  Jim Fassel, New York Giants
1998—  Dan Reeves, Atlanta Falcons
1999—  Dick Vermeil, St. Louis Rams
2000—  Jim Haslett, New Orleans Saints
2001—  Dick Jauron, Chicago Bears
2002—  Andy Reid, Philadelphia Eagles
2003—  Bill Parcells, Dallas Cowboys
2004—  Jim Mora, Jr., Atlanta Falcons
2005—  Lovie Smith, Chicago Bears
2006—  Sean Payton, New Orleans Saints 
2007—  Mike McCarthy, Green Bay Packers
2008—  Mike Smith, Atlanta Falcons
2009—  Sean Payton, New Orleans Saints 
2010—  Mike Smith, Atlanta Falcons
2011—  Jim Harbaugh, San Francisco 49ers 
2012—  Pete Carroll, Seattle Seahawks 
2013—  Ron Rivera, Carolina Panthers
2014—  Bruce Arians, Arizona Cardinals 
2015—  Ron Rivera, Carolina Panthers
2016—  Jason Garrett, Dallas Cowboys
2017—  Sean McVay, Los Angeles Rams
2018—  Matt Nagy, Chicago Bears
2019—  Kyle Shanahan, San Francisco 49ers
2020—  Ron Rivera, Washington Football Team
2021—  Matt LaFleur, Green Bay Packers

AFC Coach of the Year
1969— Hank Stram, Kansas City Chiefs
1970— Paul Brown, Cincinnati Bengals
1971— Don Shula, Miami Dolphins
1972— Don Shula, Miami Dolphins
1973— John Ralston, Denver Broncos 
1974— Sid Gillman, Houston Oilers 
1975— Ted Marchibroda, Baltimore Colts
1976— Chuck Fairbanks, New England Patriots
1977— Red Miller, Denver Broncos
1978— Jack Patera, Seattle Seahawks
1979— Don Coryell, San Diego Chargers
1980— Chuck Knox, Buffalo Bills
1981— Forrest Gregg, Cincinnati Bengals
1982— No award due to players strike
1983— Chuck Knox, Seattle Seahawks
1984— Dan Reeves, Denver Broncos
1985— Raymond Berry, New England Patriots
1986— Marty Schottenheimer, Cleveland Browns
1987— Ron Meyer, Indianapolis Colts
1988— Marv Levy, Buffalo Bills
1989— Dan Reeves, Denver Broncos 
1990— Art Shell, Los Angeles Raiders
1991— Dan Reeves, Denver Broncos
1992— Bobby Ross, San Diego Chargers
1993— Jack Pardee, Houston Oilers 
1994— Bill Cowher, Pittsburgh Steelers
1995— Marty Schottenheimer, Kansas City Chiefs
1996— Mike Shanahan, Denver Broncos
1997— Marty Schottenheimer, Kansas City Chiefs
1998— Mike Shanahan, Denver Broncos
1999— Jim Mora, Indianapolis Colts
2000— Jon Gruden, Oakland Raiders
2001— Bill Belichick, New England Patriots
2002— Jeff Fisher, Tennessee Titans
2003— Bill Belichick, New England Patriots
2004— Marty Schottenheimer San Diego Chargers
2005— Tony Dungy, Indianapolis Colts
2006— Eric Mangini, New York Jets 
2007— Bill Belichick, New England Patriots
2008— Tony Sparano, Miami Dolphins
2009— Marvin Lewis, Cincinnati Bengals
2010— Todd Haley, Kansas City Chiefs
2011— Gary Kubiak, Houston Texans
2012— Chuck Pagano and Bruce Arians, co-winners, Indianapolis Colts 
2013— Andy Reid, Kansas City Chiefs
2014— Bill Belichick, New England Patriots
2015— Andy Reid, Kansas City Chiefs
2016— Jack Del Rio, Oakland Raiders
2017— Doug Marrone, Jacksonville Jaguars
2018— Frank Reich, Indianapolis Colts
2019— John Harbaugh, Baltimore Ravens
2020— Kevin Stefanski, Cleveland Browns
2021— Mike Vrabel, Tennessee Titans

Lamar Hunt Award
2008—  Members of the "Foolish Club" (the group that founded the AFL; Lamar Hunt (Dallas Texans) and Bud Adams, Jr. (Houston Oilers), Harry Wismer (New York Titans), Bob Howsam (Denver Broncos), Barron Hilton (Los Angeles Chargers), Ralph C. Wilson, Jr. (Buffalo Bills), Billy Sullivan (Boston Patriots), and Chet Soda (Oakland Raiders).)
2009—  Tony Dungy
2010—  Monday Night Football
2011—  NFL Films
2012—  Roger Staubach
2013—  Don Shula
2014—  Len Dawson
2015—  Paul Tagliabue
2016—  Super Bowl I 
2017—  Al Michaels
2018—  Peyton Manning
2019—  Super Bowls III and IV
2020—  Bart Starr
Source

See also
Bert Bell Award
Maxwell Football Club
Touchdown Club of Columbus
DC Touchdown Club
National Football League Most Valuable Player Award
NFL Defensive Player of the Year Award
NFL Offensive Player of the Year Award
UPI AFL-AFC Player of the Year
UPI NFC Player of the Year

Footnotes

External links
2012 NFL 101 Award Winners Announced
Don Shula Selected as the 2013 Lamar Hunt Award Winner

National Football League trophies and awards
American football mass media
Sports organizations established in 1969
1969 establishments in Missouri
American journalism organizations